Ali Abdu Ahmed is a former Eritrean politician who left the government and sought asylum abroad. From 2007 until his defection in November 2012, Ali was the Eritrean Minister of Information. His father(an Eritrean national), brother, and 15-year-old daughter, a United States (US) citizen, were subsequently detained while trying to cross the border into Sudan and have been held indefinitely. Ali Abdu was born on 1963 in Asmara Eritrea. At the age of 13, Ali Abdu joined the Eritrean People's Liberation Front,(EPLF) a Marxist-Leninist guerilla force that sought an independent and free Eritrea. He was a radio operator for Eritrea's President Isaias Afwerki. His older brother, Saleh Younis (born in 1961) represents him as he refuses to speak to journalists and is currently in hiding in Melbourne, Australia. Back when Ali Abdu was the Ministry of Information to Eritrea, his brother was the editor of awate.com, an Eritrean government opposition news website. When his brother publishes an article to the website, the president would slap Ali Abdu in the face and use inappropriate language while questioning the reason why his brother is publishing those articles. Eventually, Ali Abdu would network himself with the Eritrean opposition website to "expose the brutality of the PFDJ government." After Eritrea's independence, Ali Abdu became Eritrea's ambassador to multiple countries, according to his affidavit submitted to the Australian court. Those countries are Germany, Austria, Belgium and the Vatican. His tenure as an ambassador ended when he joined the Eritrea's Ministry of Information as a journalist in 2000. He has been seen several times interviewing the president. While joining the information ministry, he also joined Eritrea's National Security committee and was responsible for the death of two Eritrean journalists. The then-information minister was the architect of Eritrea's repressive media and heavy censorship.

The US government inquired regarding his daughter's well-being while the Eritrean government vehemently rejected her status as an US citizen and has refused to release information regarding her whereabouts or well being. Meanwhile, Ali has applied for asylum in Australia and is afraid that he may be harmed by pro-government Eritreans in the diaspora. Ever since his daughter, brother and father's imprisonment, Ali Abdu has fallen into deep depression and had thoughts of committing suicide.

Ali Abdu suffers from type 1 diabetes and high-blood pressure. He is known by his colleagues to suffer anxiety attacks as well.

References

Voice of America: Fate of American Citizen Unknown After Four Years in Eritrean Prison Accessed 19 September 2016.
"Asmara Angst". WikiLeaks.
"AFP Reporter Ordered to Leave Eritrea". WikiLeaks.
"I, Ali Abdu Ahmed, of C04/415 Brunswick Road, Brunswick West, in the state of Victoria, ex-Minister for Information in Eritrea, make the following declaration under the Statutory Declaration Act 1959".

Living people
People's Front for Democracy and Justice politicians
Government ministers of Eritrea
1963 births